The constituent parts of the National Capital Territory of Delhi form an urban agglomeration. In the census of India 2011, an urban agglomeration (UA) has been defined as follows:

"An urban agglomeration is a continuous urban spread constituting a town and its adjoining outgrowths (OGs), or two or more physically contiguous towns together with or without outgrowths of such towns. An Urban Agglomeration must consist of at least a statutory town and its total population (i.e. all the constituents put together) should not be less than 20,000 as per the 2001 Census. In varying local conditions, there were similar other combinations which have been treated
as urban agglomerations satisfying the basic condition of contiguity."

Delhi urban agglomeration constituents
This is a list of towns and cities that are constituent parts of the urban agglomeration (UA) of Delhi,   a union territory of India. All have a population greater than 100,000, as counted in the 2011 census of India.

Non-city constituents
The urban agglomeration (UA) of Delhi has 113 constituent parts, as identified by the Directorate of Census Operations, for the 2011 census of India. Of these, 100 are defined as towns for census purposes,  which may categorised as any of: Municipal Corporations, Municipal Councils, Cantonment Boards, Census Towns, or Out Growths, and 13 are cities. These, all with a population of 1 lakh or more, are noted below:

Census Towns

 Aali 
 Alipur
 Asola 
 Aya Nagar

 Babarpur
 Bakhtawarpur
 Bakkar Wala
 Bankauli 
 Bankner 
 Bapraula
 Baqiabad
 Barwala  
 Bawana  
 Begum Pur
 Bhalswa Jahangirpur 
 Bhati 
 Bhor Garh
 Burari  
* Chandan Hola
 Chattarpur
 Chhawala
 Chilla Saroda Bangar
 Chilla Saroda Khadar

 Daryapur Kalan
 Dayalpur
 Dallopura 
 Dindarpur
 Deoli
 Dera Mandi
 Fatehpur Beri

 Gharonda Neemka Bangar (also known as Patparganj)
 Gharoli
 Gheora
 Gokalpur 
 Ghitorni
 Hastsal
 Ibrahimpur

 Jaitpur
 Jiwanpur (also called Johripur) 
 Jaffrabad
 Jharoda Kalan
 Jonapur
 Jharoda Majra Burari
 
 Kanjhawala 
 Kamalpur Majra Burari 
 Kapas Hera
 Karala
 Karawal Nagar 
 Kair
 Khanpur Dhani 
 Khajoori Khas
 Khera
 Khera Kalan
 Khera Khurd 
 Kirari Suleman Nagar 
 Kondli
 Kotla Mahigiran
 Kusumpur
 Ladpur
 Libaspur
* Maidan Garhi
 Mehrauli
 Mukhmelpur
 Moradabad Pahari
 Malikpur Kohi alias Rangpuri
 Mithepur
 Molarband 
 Mirpur Turk
 Mubarak Pur Dabas
 Mustafabad 
 Mohammad Pur Majri
 Mandoli 
 Mukandpur
 Mundka
 Mitraon
 Nilothi
 Nangloi Jat
 Nithari
 Neb Sarai
 Nangli Sakrawati

 Pooth Kalan
 Pooth Khurd
 Pul Pehlad
 Prahlad Pur Bangar
 Qadipur
 Quammruddin Nagar

 Rajapur Khurd
 Rajokri
 Rani Khera 
 Roshanpura (also called Dichaon Khurd)

 Sultanpur Majra 
 Saidabad
 Shakarpur Baramad
 Sadatpur Gujran  
 Siraspur
 Sahibabad Daulatpur
 Shafipur Ranhola
 Tikri Kalan
 Sambhalka
 Sultanpur 
 Saidul Azaib  

 Taj Pul
 Tukhmirpur  
 Tilangpur Kotla
 Tigri
 Tikri Khurd
 Ziauddinpur

Cantonment Boards
 Delhi Cantonment

Out Growths
 Nil

Municipal Corporations
 Delhi Municipal Corporation

Municipal Councils
 New Delhi (NDMC)

Constituents with city status
Constituents of the Delhi UA which are classified as cities, all with a population greater than 100,000, as per the 2011 census, are shown in the table below.

Abbreviations: M Corp. = Municipal Corporation, M = Municipality, CT = Census Town, OG = Out Growth, NA = Notified Area, CB = Cantonment Board

References

Delhi
Cities